Mount Vineuo, also known as Mount Oiautukekea, is a mountain on Goodenough Island, Papua New Guinea. The mountain is the highest peak in the D'Entrecasteaux Islands.

See also
 List of Ultras of Oceania
 List of islands by highest point
 Battle of Goodenough Island

References

External links
 

Vineuo
D'Entrecasteaux Islands